Annemarie Carpendale (born 29 October 1977 in Hanover, Lower Saxony) is a German television host and singer. From 2000 to 2005 she was a dancer in the band Bellini. She has been with ProSieben since 2005, where she hosts the tabloid programs taff and red!.

Biography
Carpendale was born in Hanover and grew up in Siegen, where her mother worked as a primary school teacher. She danced in Ballet, played Piano and performed in various theaters.

In 2000 she became a dancer in the pop group Bellini. In 2005 she left the band to concentrate on moderating and studying for the college. In between she had extra appearances in various television series, shows and in the movie Pura Vida Ibiza. She was also active in the news editorial team of RTL Zwei and worked part-time as a photo and catwalk model. In 2002 she took part in a casting at VIVA and made it into the final selection. From March 2004 she moderated the charts, from May 2004 she worked for the Club Rotation format.

Since March 2005 she has hosted the program taff on ProSieben, initially together with Stefan Gödde and since March 2009 with Daniel Aminati. Since November 2008 she has also moderated the weekly star and lifestyle magazine red! Stars, Lifestyle & More. Since 2007, she and Steven Gätjen have presented the ProSieben coverage of the Academy Awards, in which taff and red! broadcasts annually from Los Angeles. After Gätjen's departure from ProSieben, she was accompanied in 2016 by taff presenter Viviane Geppert. From 2016 to 2018 she hosted the "dating show" Kiss Bang Love.

The tenth season of the ProSieben and Sat.1 casting show The Voice of Germany will be presented by Carpendale as a substitute for Lena Gercke, alongside Thore Schölermann.

Personal life
Carpendale was in a relationship with Oliver Pocher from 2002 to 2004. On 28 September 2013, she married the actor Wayne Carpendale in Ibiza, with whom she was in a relationship from November 2007 and was engaged in December 2011. Their son was born in May 2018.

Filmography

Movies
 2004: Pura Vida Ibiza
 2011:

Series
 1999: Kinderquatsch mit Michael (1 Episode)
 2004: Interaktiv (3 Episodes)
 2004: Weck Up (1 Episode)
 2005: Die 100 nervigsten... (1 Episode)
 2006: Extreme Activity (2 Episodes)
 2006: Quiz Taxi (1 Episode)
 2008: Promi ärgere dich nicht! (1 Episode)
 seit 2011: Sat.1-Frühstücksfernsehen (regular)
 2012: Der Landarzt (1 Episode)
 2012: Markus Lanz (1 Episode)
 2014: Die Garmisch-Cops (1 Episode)
 2018: Pastewka (1 Episode)
 2018: Endlich Feierabend! (1 Episode)

Moderation
 2004–2005: VIVA Club Rotation (VIVA)
 since 2005: taff (ProSieben)
 2007: Bravo Supershow
 since 2007: Oscars (ProSieben)
 since 2008: red! Stars, Lifestyle & More (ProSieben)
 2011: VIPictures by red! (ProSieben)
 2012: VIPictures Hollywood (ProSieben)
 2016–2018: Kiss Bang Love (ProSieben)
 2016: Ran an den Mann, 2 Seasons (Sat.1, with Wayne Carpendale)
 2017: It's Showtime! Das Battle der Besten, 6 Episodes in 1 Season (Sat.1)
 2020: The Voice of Germany, season 10 (ProSieben and Sat.1)

References

1977 births
Living people
People from Hanover
ProSieben people